Jørn Christensen (born December 29, 1959) is a Norwegian artist, actor, and record producer. He is known as a prominent and original guitarist of many leading Norwegian bands. Some of the more important projects have been those in conjunction with Ola Snortheim, the force behind Langsomt Mot Nord, which Christensen came up with the name for. Christensen is also a producer, and has worked with popular Norwegian bands like deLillos.

He had a leading role in the Norwegian movie X (1986), directed by Oddvar Einarson.

In 2008, Christensen also appeared on the children's album "Magic hooks & secrets" produced by Linn Skåber and Jacob Young with the song "Winter is here". Other artists who participated were Simone Larsen, Maria Haukaas Storeng, Egil Hegerberg, Venke Knutson, Alejandro Fuentes, Julius Winger, Live Maria Roggen, Alexander Rybak, Paal Flaata and Andrea Bræin Hovig.

Jørn Christensen has been a member of the following Norwegian bands:

Can Can
CC Cowboys
Cirkus Modern
De Press
Langsomt Mot Nord
Mercury Motors
Norske Gutter
Thinkerbell
Young Neils

References

Sources in Norwegian 

 Jørn Christensen Wikipedia
 Jørn Christensen Rockipedia

1959 births
Living people
Norwegian rock guitarists
Norwegian record producers
Norwegian male film actors
Place of birth missing (living people)